Miao Tian may refer to:

Miao Tien (1925–2005), Chinese film actor
Miao Tian (rower) (born 1993), Chinese rower